SO16 may refer to:
 The Diplomatic Protection Group, a Specialist Operations branch of London's Metropolitan Police Service
 2010 SO16, a near-Earth asteroid
 (29459) 1997 SO16, main-belt minor planet